Scutinanthe is a genus of plants in family Burseraceae. It contains the following species (but this list may be incomplete):
 Scutinanthe brunnea

References

Burseraceae
Burseraceae genera
Taxonomy articles created by Polbot